The competing in Group 7 of the 2004 UEFA European Under-21 Championships qualifying competition were Turkey, England, Slovakia, Macedonia and Portugal.

Standings

Matches
All times are CET.

Goalscorers
8 goals
 Hélder Postiga

6 goals

 Francis Jeffers
 Tuncay

5 goals
 Róbert Jež

3 goals

 Shola Ameobi
 Ricardo Quaresma
 Kemal Aslan

2 goals
 Branislav Obžera

1 goal

 Joey Barton
 Peter Clarke
 Joe Cole
 Phil Jagielka
 Zoran Baldovaliev
 Toni Meglenski
 Borce Postolov
 Aco Stojkov
 Bruno Alves
 Ednilson
 Luis Lourenço
 Ariza Makukula
 Carlos Martins
 Tiago Mendes
 Jorge Ribeiro 
 Cristiano Ronaldo
 Hugo Viana
 Ján Ďurica
 Halil Altıntop
 Servet Çetin
 Sinan Kaloğlu
 Hüseyin Kartal
 Selçuk Şahin
 Fatih Sonkaya
 İbrahim Toraman
 İbrahim Yavuz

1 own goal

 Daniel Ivanovski (playing against Slovakia)
 Toni Meglenski (playing against Turkey)
 Peter Doležaj (playing against England)

External links
 Group 7 at UEFA.com

Group 7
Under